"He Was Really Sayin' Somethin' is a soul song written by Motown songwriters Norman Whitfield, William "Mickey" Stevenson, and Edward Holland, Jr. in 1964. The song is notable in both a 1964 version by American Motown girl group the Velvelettes, and a 1982 hit version (with the title altered to "Really Saying Something")  by British girl group Bananarama.

Overview

Velvelettes version
The original version of the song was recorded by Motown group the Velvelettes in December 1964. An alternate version recorded in October/November had been discarded. Produced by Norman Whitfield, the Velvelettes' version was released on Motown's V.I.P. label on December 27, 1964, and was a minor hit for the group in early 1965. "He Was Really Sayin' Somethin'" peaked at number 64 on the U.S. Billboard Hot 100, and at number 21 on the then recently reinstated Billboard R&B Singles chart. The single was the second most successful release for the Velvelettes, a minor Motown act which never released a full-length album.

"Throw a Farewell Kiss", composed by Whitfield and Holland and produced by Whitfield, had been recorded in October 1962 and was issued as the B-side of "He Was Really Sayin' Somethin'". Six years later, Whitfield had the Temptations record "Farewell Kiss" for their 1971 album Sky's the Limit.

Bananarama version
In 1982, the British girl group Bananarama recorded a cover version of the song and released it as the first single from their debut album Deep Sea Skiving. Fun Boy Three provided background vocals, having had a hit with Bananarama earlier in the year with another cover, "T'ain't What You Do (It's the Way That You Do It)".

The 1982 single became the second consecutive top-five hit for both Bananarama and Fun Boy Three, peaking at number five in the UK singles chart.  It also received heavy play on the then-young MTV network in America.  "Really Saying Something" was both groups' second chart entry in Australia, peaking at number seventy-four.  The B-side, "Give Us Back Our Cheap Fares", has been issued on CD for the first time on the 2007 UK reissue of Deep Sea Skiving as one of five bonus tracks. It also became the group's third single to chart in America but only became a minor hit peaking at #108.

The song was revived in 2005 by Solasso, who remixed the song and released it as a bootleg remix. It was later included on Bananarama's album Drama.

Buffalo G version 

The Irish girl group Buffalo G released a rap cover version of the song in 2000, reaching the top 20 in both the Irish and UK charts.

Shakespears Sister version 

In late February 2011, Siobhan Fahey's current project, Shakespears Sister announced that they were releasing their own version of "Really Saying Something", as a special anniversary single, celebrating 30 years since Bananarama recorded their first single.  The single was available exclusively on Shakespears Sister's web site as a digital download and a limited edition CD single. Copies of the CD single are no longer in production, and it is now one of Shakespears Sister's rarest collectibles to date. Fahey produced the single with her designer Anthony Walton, in an attempt to promote her forthcoming live releases.

Track listing 
CD single / Digital download
"Really Saying Something" — 2:36
"A Loaded Gun" — 4:15

2013 digital download
"Really Saying Something" — 2:36
"A Loaded Gun" — 4:15
"A Loaded Gun" (Early Version)

Releases
 UK 7" single NANA1
"Really Saying Something"  2:41
"Give Us Back Our Cheap Fares"  2:44

 US 7" single LD201
"Really Saying Something" (US Version) 3:44
"Give Us Back Our Cheap Fares"  2:44

 UK 12" vinyl NANX1
"Really Saying Something" (Extended Mix)  5:40
Remixed by Fun Boy Three
"Give Us Back Our Cheap Fares" (Extended Version)  4:25

 UK 12" vinyl - stickered limited edition NANX1
"Really Saying Something" (Extended Mix)  5:40
Remixed by Fun Boy Three
"Aie A Mwana" (Extended Version)  5:46

 US 12" vinyl LLD101
"Really Saying Something" (Extended US Version)  7:50
"Aie A Mwana" (Extended US Version)  6:46
"Aie A Mwana" (Dub Mix)  4:38

 German 12" vinyl 6400 606
"Really Saying Something" (Extended Mix)  5:40
"Give Us Back Our Cheap Fares" (Extended Version)  4:25

 2005 versions
"Really Saying Something" (Solasso Mix) 5:58  Taken from the album Drama
"Really Saying Something" (Solasso Radio Edit)
"Really Saying Something" (Solasso Dirty Dub)  5:58
"Really Saying Something" (Hardino Radio Edit)
"Really Saying Something" (Hardino Remix) 6:20
"Really Saying Something" (DJ Bomba & Soulseekerz Remix)  6:37
"Really Saying Something" (Kenny Hayes Sunshine Funk Remix)  5:34
"Really Saying Something" (Giresse Breakbeat Remix)  5:21
"Really Saying Something" (Shanghai Surprise Radio Edit) 3:21
"Really Saying Something" (Shanghai Surprise Club Mix) 6:44

Charts

Velvelettes version

Bananarama version

Buffalo G version

References 

1964 songs
1965 singles
1982 singles
Bananarama songs
Fun Boy Three songs
Motown singles
London Records singles
Songs written by Norman Whitfield
Songs written by Eddie Holland
Songs written by William "Mickey" Stevenson